Ellwood Wilson was a college football player, considered the "founder of Sewanee Tigers football." He came to Sewanee from New Jersey, and at first used an oval block of wood in place of a football.

References

Sewanee Tigers football players
American football quarterbacks
Players of American football from New Jersey